is a passenger railway station located in the city of Saijō, Ehime Prefecture, Japan. It is operated by JR Shikoku and has the station number "Y36".

Lines
Nyūgawa Station is served by the JR Shikoku Yosan Line and is located 126.8 km from the beginning of the line at Takamatsu. Connections with other local or limited express trains are needed to travel further east or west along the line.

In addition, the following JR Shikoku limited express services also serve the station:

Layout
The station consists of an island platform and a side platform serving three tracks. The station building houses a waiting room, a convenience store and a bakery, and a JR ticket window (with a Midori no Madoguchi facility). The island platform is accessed by means of a footbridge. Car parking is available.

A passing loop runs to the west of the island platform and several short sidings branch off the main tracks.

Adjacent stations

History
At that time the station was operated by Japanese Government Railways, later becoming Japanese National Railways (JNR). With the privatization of JNR on 1 April 1987, control of the station passed to JR Shikoku.

Surrounding area
Saijo City Food Creation Center
Pompoko Bridge
Saijo City Hall Toyo General Branch (former Toyo City Hall)

See also
 List of railway stations in Japan

References

External links

Nyūgawa Station (JR Shikoku)

Railway stations in Ehime Prefecture
Railway stations in Japan opened in 1923
Saijō, Ehime